Aleksandr Shaparenko (sometimes shown as Aleksandr Shaporenko, born 16 February 1946) is a Soviet-born Ukrainian sprint canoeist who competed from the late 1960s to the late 1970s. Competing in three Summer Olympics, he won three medals with two golds (1968: K-2 1000 m, 1972: K-1 1000 m) and one silver (1968: K-1 1000 m).

Shaparenko also won 13 medals at the ICF Canoe Sprint World Championships with seven golds (K-1 1000 m: 1966, 1970; K-1 10000 m: 1973, K-2 1000 m: 1966, K-4 10000 m: 1977, 1978, 1979), two silvers (K-1 10000 m: 1974, K-4 1000 m: 1974), and four bronzes (K-1 1000 m: 1971, 1973; K-4 1000 m: 1966, 1979).

References

External links
 
 

1946 births
Canoeists at the 1968 Summer Olympics
Canoeists at the 1972 Summer Olympics
Canoeists at the 1976 Summer Olympics
Living people
Soviet male canoeists
Ukrainian male canoeists
Olympic canoeists of the Soviet Union
Olympic gold medalists for the Soviet Union
Olympic silver medalists for the Soviet Union
Olympic medalists in canoeing
ICF Canoe Sprint World Championships medalists in kayak
Medalists at the 1972 Summer Olympics
Medalists at the 1968 Summer Olympics
Sportspeople from Sumy Oblast